Mikey Post (April 29, 1982 – February 17, 2018) was an American actor. He had dwarfism and was three feet two inches tall.

He appeared in the films Black Knight, Rest Stop, Rest Stop 2, Killer Pad, Skid Marks, Bedtime Stories,  TV shows MADtv, Boardwalk Empire, 90210 and on Animal Planet's Reality Show Pit Boss.  He also played a recurring character on Disney XD's Pair of Kings.

Biography 
Mikey Post was born in Columbus, Ohio, but soon after his birth he and his family moved to Roswell, Georgia, where he lived for most of his life.  He attended a Performing Arts School North Springs High School, studying different acting techniques and performing in numerous plays. After high school, he attended the University of Georgia (UGA) and received his bachelor's degree in Management Information Systems Technology.  In 2013, Mikey announced via his Facebook fan page that he was struggling with his health after being diagnosed with amyotrophic lateral sclerosis (ALS).

Career 
While attending UGA, Mikey auditioned for commercials and movies in between his studies. Through his Atlanta-based talent agent, The People Store, Mikey booked a minor role in the movie Black Knight. While the role Mikey auditioned for was only a bit part, Martin Lawrence and the director Gil Junger decided they wanted to feature Mikey more throughout the film.  Although the role was a small one, it helped jumpstart Mikey's career.  After graduating college, Mikey moved to Hollywood, California.  Mikey later appeared in various feature films and also played the role of Wicket for the Star Wars nationwide tour in 2006 and in the Rose Parade on New Year's Day 2007.  He was most recently seen in national commercials for Radio Shack (as Gumdrop the elf), Big Lots (as the Big Lots Spokes Elf), and Go Daddy.  He most notably appeared in the movie Bedtime Stories, starring Adam Sandler & Keri Russell, where he played the Angry Dwarf.

Death 
Post died on February 17, 2018, at the age of 35. His cause of death was amyotrophic lateral sclerosis.

Filmography

Film

Television

References

External links 

Mikey's Myspace
Article about Mikey's role in Bedtime Stories

1982 births
2018 deaths
Actors with dwarfism
American male film actors
American male television actors
Neurological disease deaths in the United States
Deaths from motor neuron disease
Male actors from Georgia (U.S. state)
People from Roswell, Georgia